Lick-Wilmerding High School is a private college-preparatory high school located in San Francisco, California, United States.

History

Lick-Wilmerding High School was founded on September 21, 1874 as the California School of Mechanical Arts by a trust from James Lick. George Merrill was hired to manage the school as the first director, and Lick, as the school was informally known, officially opened in January, 1895. George Merrill was the director of Lick until 1939, and later also the director of the Wilmerding School of Industrial Arts and the Lux School for Industrial Training for Girls, which were both located immediately adjacent to the Lick campus at 17th Street & Potrero Avenue in the Mission District. In the early 1950s, The California School of Mechanical arts and the Wilmerding School of Industrial Arts merged to become Lick-Wilmerding High School. The Lux School later closed, and its students joined Lick-Wilmerding.  Lick-Wilmerding High School moved to a new campus at 755 Ocean Avenue in 1956.

Academics

Curriculum
Each student must be enrolled in a minimum of six five‐unit courses per semester, regardless of grade level. A total of 30 units per semester are required. Every student is required to complete two semesters of technical arts courses (such as wood, metal, jewelry, or electronics), one semester of performing arts, and two semesters of visual arts. Additionally, students must complete three semesters of health class (BME).

Technical courses include Metal, Woodworking, Robotics, Electronics and Jewelry. LWHS also has several year-long Architecture courses and an introduction to design course, entitled Contemporary Media and Art that is compulsory for all freshmen.

LWHS' Performing Arts Department has a choir, jazz band, orchestra, and two a cappella vocal ensembles. There is also a dance program comprising four classes: Dance 1, Dance 2, Dance Ensemble, and Dance Company. The Ehrer Theatre (named after Marcel Roy Ehrer, an american of french and alsatian origin) Program presents plays, musicals, and a festival of original one-act plays written and directed by students. Theatre class offerings include: Acting 1, Acting Intensive, Improv, Playwriting, Stagecraft, and Directing.

Community

As of the 2021-2022 school year, the student body is 9% South Asian, 6% Southeast Asian, 11% African-American, 18% Latino, 29% East Asian, and 62% Caucasian. Overall, 35% of the student body identifies as multiethnic, which explains why the sum of these percentages is more than 100%.

Test scores

In 2014, the Huffington Post reported that students at LWHS had the 8th highest SAT scores in the nation.

Averages for the class of 2018:

ACT
 ACT Average Composite 32 (52 takers).

SAT Reasoning Test
SAT Average Score: 1420 (85 takers)

SAT Subject Tests (and number of test takers)
Biology Ecology: 593 (7)
Biology Molecular: 645 (2)
Chemistry: 689 (25)
 Chinese with Listening: 587 (3)
English Literature: 665 (71)
French: 651 (10)
 French with Listening: 710 (1)
 Korean with Listening: 800 (1)
Math Level I: 599 (13)
Math Level II: 708 (73)
Physics: 672 (9)
Spanish: 685 (6)
 Spanish with Listening: 695 (6)
US History: 595 (6)
World History: 640 (1)

Advanced Placement Scores
In spring of 2018, 38 students took 44 Advanced Placement exams; 93% of the scores 3 or higher

Admissions
On average, Lick-Wilmerding receives approximately 950 applications each year for 139 seats in the incoming 9th grade class. Full Tuition for the 2018–2019 school year is $47,209, with Flexible Tuition ranging from $700 to $47,000. This includes books, lunch, and all course materials and supplies

Aim High Program
Aim High was founded in 1986, with 50 students and 12 teachers, on the campus of Lick-Wilmerding High School in San Francisco.

The program has evolved into a collaboration with several educational institutions: Lick-Wilmerding High School, The Urban School of San Francisco, the San Francisco Unified School District and St. Paul's Episcopal School. Additional partners include the Bay Area Teachers Center, the Golden Gate National Recreation Area and the Exploratorium."

Extracurricular activities

Technical Arts Courses 
The following courses were available during the 2021-22 school year.

 3D-Printing and Parametric Design
 Circuits and Electronics: Analog and Digital
 Circuits and Electronics: Device Invention
 Community Computing PPP
 Design & Technology
 Graphics and Game Design (formerly Computing 1)
 Jewelry 1
 Jewelry 2
 Private Skills for a Public Purpose (PPP)
 Rethinking Furniture
 Sewing and Textile Arts Level 1
 Sewing and Textile Arts Level 2 PPP
 Wood: Joinery and Turning

Athletics 

Fall Teams:
 Boys and Girls Cross Country
 Girls Varsity, Junior Varsity and Frosh/Soph Volleyball
 Girls Varsity and Junior Varsity Tennis
 Girls Varsity Field Hockey
 Boys and Girls Water Polo
 Flag Football/Ultimate Frisbee (Club)
 Sailing (Club)
Winter Teams:
Boys Varsity, Junior Varsity, and Frosh/Soph Basketball
Girls Varsity, Junior Varsity, and Frosh/Soph Basketball
 Boys Varsity, Junior Varsity, and Frosh/Soph Soccer
 Girls Varsity and Junior Varsity Soccer
Boys and Girls Wrestling
Spring Teams:
 Boys and Girls Track and Field
 Boys and Girls Badminton
 Boys Varsity Lacrosse
 Girls Varsity Lacrosse
 Boys Varsity Baseball
 Girls Varsity Softball
 Boys and Girls Varsity and Junior Varsity Swimming
 Boys Varsity and Junior Varsity Tennis

Awards 

Alternet.com has also designated Lick-Wilmerding as the 6th top high school in the United States utilizing Green Architecture

California Music Education Association Honors
Chamber Singers: Unanimous Superior, 2004, 2005, 2006, 2007.
Big Band: Unanimous Excellent, two years running, and Unanimous Superior, two years before.
Advanced Jazz Combo: Unanimous Superior, for four years
Orchestra: Unanimous Superior, for one year

Anaheim Heritage Festival Honors
2004: Chamber Singers and Chamber Orchestra: Gold

Notable alumni

Andres Amador — artist
Dan the Automator — DJ/Producer
John Lane Bell — mathematician and philosopher
Nathan Chan — Assistant Principal Cello, Seattle Symphony
Wayne M. Collins — civil rights attorney
John D. Goldman — philanthropist (class of '67)
C. J. Goodell — Associate Justice, Court of Appeal of California, First Appellate District (1945–1953)
Luca Iaconi-Stewart — model aircraft builder
Jonathon Keats — conceptual artist
Gerek Meinhardt — fencer at the 2008 Summer Olympics, youngest American Olympian fencer
mxmtoon — Singer-songwriter
Albert Overhauser — National Medal of Science winner (class of '42)
Lionel Pries — University of Washington faculty member and noted Seattle architect
Harold W. Roberts — WWI Congressional Medal of Honor recipient
Ned Segal — businessperson
Frederick Seitz — physicist, National Medal of Science winner
Arlo Smith — former San Francisco District Attorney's Office (1980-1996)
Teresa Strasser — radio and television personality, writer
Laura Sullivan — Investigative Correspondent for NPR, winner of three Peabody Awards
Francis Tapon — author, public speaker, global nomad
Noe Venable — singer, songwriter
Kate Weare — dancer / choreographer / founder and artistic director of Kate Weare Company
Benjamin Wildman-Tobriner — 2008 Gold Medal Olympic swimmer and former world record holder

See also
San Francisco County high schools

References

External links
 Lick-Wilmerding Website

High schools in San Francisco
Private high schools in California
Educational institutions established in 1874
1874 establishments in California
Preparatory schools in California